A single-reed instrument is a woodwind instrument that uses only one reed to produce sound. The very earliest single-reed instruments were documented in ancient Egypt, as well as the Middle East, Greece, and the Roman Empire. The earliest types of single-reed instruments used idioglottal reeds, where the vibrating reed is a tongue cut and shaped on the tube of cane.  Much later, single-reed instruments started using heteroglottal reeds, where a reed is cut and separated from the tube of cane and attached to a mouthpiece of some sort.  By contrast, in a double reed instrument (such as the oboe and bassoon), there is no mouthpiece; the two parts of the reed vibrate against one another. Reeds are traditionally made of cane and produce sound when air is blown across or through them. The type of instruments that use a single reed are clarinets and saxophone. The timbre of a single and double reed instrument is related to the harmonic series caused by the shape of the corpus. E.g. the clarinet is only including the odd harmonics due to air column modes canceling out the even harmonics. This may be compared to the timbre of a square wave.

Most single-reed instruments are descended from single-reed idioglot instruments called 'memet', found in Egypt as early as 2700 BCE.  Due to their fragility, no instruments from antiquity were preserved but iconographic evidence is prevalent.  During the Old Kingdom in Egypt (2778–2723 BCE), memets were depicted on the reliefs of seven tombs at Saqqarra, six tombs at Giza, and the pyramids of Queen Khentkaus.  Most memets were double-clarinets, where two reed tubes were tied or glued together to form one instrument.  Multiple pipes were used to reinforce sound or generate a strong beat-tone with slight variations in tuning among the pipes. One of the tubes usually functioned as a drone, but the design of these simple instruments varied endlessly. The entire reed entered the mouth, meaning that the player could not easily articulate so melodies were defined by quick movement of the fingers on the tone holes. These types of double-clarinets are still prevalent today, but also developed into simplified single-clarinets and hornpipes. Modern-day idioglots found in Egypt include the arghul and the zummara.

Examples include clarinets, saxophones, and some bagpipes. See links to other examples below.

Classification

Single reed instruments fall under three Hornbostel–Sachs classes:

 412.13 Free reeds.
 422.2 Single reed instruments: The pipe has a single 'reed' consisting of a percussion lamella. These are the percussion reeds including clarinets and saxophones.
 422.3 Reedpipes with free reeds: The reed vibrates through [at] a closely fitted frame, and there are fingerholes.

Comparing clarinets and saxophones
The following is a list of clarinets and saxophones, relative to their range and key of transposition from the opposite family:

Note that if one was to compare clarinets to their saxophone counterparts while considering their approximate lowest (concert) pitch†, the order would shift:

 †The lowest possible pitch of each clarinet and saxophone is dependent on its manufacturer and model (the pitches used are typical of professional instruments).

List of single-reed instruments

Modern
 Aulochrome
 Clarinet
 Heckel-clarina
 Heckelphone-clarinet
 Octavin
 Saxophone
 Tárogató
 Xaphoon
Bass Clarinet

Historical

 Mock Trumpet
 Chalumeau

Traditional

 European
 Alboka
 Birbynė
 Chalumeau
 Diplica
 Ganurags
 Hornpipe
 Launeddas
 Pilili
 Mock trumpet
 Pibgorn
 Pku
 Sipsi
 Stock-and-horn
 Zhaleika

 Middle Eastern
 Arghul
 Double clarinet
 Mijwiz
 Sipsi

 Central Asian
 Bülban

 Southeast Asian
 Pey pok
 Sarune Etek
 Sneng
 Toleat

Playing a single reed instrument 
Although the clarinet and saxophone both have a single reed attached to their mouthpiece, the playing technique or embouchure is distinct from each other.

The standard embouchures for single reed woodwinds like the clarinet and saxophone are variants of the single lip embouchure, formed by resting the reed upon the bottom lip, which rests on the teeth and is supported by the chin muscles and the buccinator muscles on the sides of the mouth. The top teeth rest on top of the mouthpiece. The manner in which the lower lip rests against the teeth differs between clarinet and saxophone embouchures. In clarinet playing, the lower lip is rolled over the teeth and corners of the mouth are drawn back, which has the effect of drawing the upper lip around the mouthpiece to create a seal due to the angle at which the mouthpiece rests in the mouth. With the saxophone embouchure, the lower lip rests against, but not over, the teeth as in pronouncing the letter "V" and the corners of the lip are drawn in (similar to a drawstring bag). With the less common double-lip embouchure, the top lip is placed under (around) the top teeth. In both instances, the position of the tongue in the mouth plays a vital role in focusing and accelerating the air stream blown by the player. This results in a more mature and full sound, rich in overtones.

References